Samuel Bayard Woodward (1787–1850) was an American psychiatrist who was the first superintendent of the Worcester Lunatic Asylum, and a co-founder and first president of the Association of Medical Superintendents of American Institutions for the Insane (later known as the American Psychiatric Association).

References

External links

1787 births
1850 deaths
American psychiatrists